Thrasher Opera House is a historic theater in Green Lake, Wisconsin, United States. It was added to the National Register of Historic Places in 1999.

History
The opera house was built by Charlie Thrasher. It began showing vaudeville and traveling theatrical performance and, later, movies. In the 1920s, the opera house installed the proper equipment to show sound films. The building underwent renovations in the 1990s. It is listed on the Wisconsin State Register of Historic Places and has been designated a City of Green Lake Historic Structure.

References

External links
 Thrasher Opera House

Buildings and structures in Green Lake County, Wisconsin
Cinemas and movie theaters in Wisconsin
Music venues completed in 1910
National Register of Historic Places in Green Lake County, Wisconsin
Opera houses on the National Register of Historic Places in Wisconsin
Theatres completed in 1910